Al-Sarm is a sub-district located in Thula District, 'Amran Governorate, Yemen. Al-Sarm had a population of 3231 according to the 2004 census.

References 

Sub-districts in Thula District